Saalegg Castle is a ruined castle in the state of Salzburg, Austria.

See also
List of castles in Austria

Castles in Salzburg (state)
Ruined castles in Austria